"Moving on Stereo" was the second single hit by French DJ Pakito, from his debut album Video. Released in August 2006, it followed "Living on Video", a number-one hit single in France, but was unable to duplicate the same huge sales and chartings, even if it met success in Poland, Finland, the Netherlands, and France where it reached the top ten. The song was written and the music composed by Julien Ranouil. The song contains a sample of "Guitar Spell" by DJ Sylvan from 1994.

Versions
 CD single
 "Moving on Stereo" (original radio edit) — 3:10
 "Moving on Stereo" (inside radio edit) — 3:12
 "Moving on Stereo" (original mix) — 6:02
 "Moving on Stereo" (inside mix) — 5:32

 7" maxi
A-side:
 "Moving on Stereo" (original mix) — 6:02
B-side:
 "Moving on Stereo" (inside mix) — 5:32

 Digital download
 "Moving on Stereo" (original radio edit) — 3:10
 "Moving on Stereo" (inside radio edit) — 3:12
 "Moving on Stereo" (original mix) — 6:02
 "Moving on Stereo" (inside mix) — 5:27

Charts

Weekly charts

Year-end charts

References

2006 singles
Trance songs
Pakito songs